Rum Branch is an unincorporated community in Cape Girardeau County, in the U.S. state of Missouri.

According to tradition, nearby Rum Branch creek was named for an incident when a bootlegger's rum was dumped in its waters.

References

Unincorporated communities in Cape Girardeau County, Missouri
Unincorporated communities in Missouri